Johan Brunström and Jean-Julien Rojer were the defending champions; however, they chose to participate in ATP World Tour 500 series tournament in Hamburg instead.

Sergio Roitman and Alexandre Sidorenko won the title, defeating Michael Kohlmann and Rogier Wassen in the final, 6–4, 6–4.

Seeds

Draw

Draw

External Links
 Doubles Draw

Poznan Porsche Open - Doubles
2009 Doubles